George Atkinson may refer to:

Government and politics
George Atkinson (Surveyor General), Surveyor General of Ceylon appointed in 1805
George Maitland Atkinson (1860–1940), Canadian politician
George W. Atkinson (1845–1925), American politician, Governor of West Virginia

Sports
George Atkinson (climber) (born 1994), British mountain climber
George Atkinson (cricketer) (1830–1906), English cricketer
George Atkinson (1900s footballer) (fl. 1904/5), English professional footballer
George Atkinson (Olympic footballer), represented Great Britain at the 1920 Summer Olympics
George Atkinson (safety) (born 1947), American football safety and kick returner
George Atkinson III (1992–2019), American football running back and kick returner

Other
George Atkinson (convict) (1764–1834), English convict and member of the First Fleet to Australia
George Atkinson (video rental businessman) (1935–2005), American businessman and video rental pioneer
George Francis Atkinson (1854–1918), American botanist and mycologist
George H. Atkinson (1819–1889), missionary and educator in Oregon, United States
George Atkinson-Willes (1847–1921), British Admiral, known as George Atkinson prior to 1901

See also
George Atkins (disambiguation)